Hubert Maurer (10 June 1738, Bonn - 10 December 1818, Vienna) was a German painter, graphic artist and art professor.

Life and work 
He began as a student of the Bavarian court painter, Johann Georg Winter (1707-1770). He continued his education at the Academy of Fine Arts, Vienna, where one of his instructors, the mentally unstable sculptor, Franz Xaver Messerschmidt, apparently tried to murder him in a fit of paranoia.

From 1772 to 1776, he was one of the first group of German painters to receive a pension that enabled them to study in Rome (the ). There, he was able to work with Anton Raphael Mengs. From 1785, he was a councilor and Professor at the Vienna Academy's elementary drawing school; a position he would hold until 1817. He also produced teaching materials, such as studies of the Old Masters of the Italian Renaissance, which marked the beginning of Classicism at the academy.

His numerous well known students include Karl Agricola, Johann Scheffer von Leonhardshoff, Moritz Michael Daffinger, Ferdinand Georg Waldmüller, Karl Ruß, Wilhelm August Rieder, Peter Fendi, Eustație Altini, Johann Baptist von Lampi, Friedrich von Amerling and Johann Michael Sattler, who would later become Maurer's biographer. Sattler also married his foster daughter, Anna Maria Kittenberger, in 1816.

A street in Bonn has been named after him.

Sources 
 "Bildungsgeschichte: Hubert Maurer Historienmahler und Prof. der Angewandten in W". In: Vaterländische Blätter für den österreichischen Kaiserstaat, 1810, Vol.2, Nr. 37/38, pp. 311 ff.
 Johann Michael Sattler: Lebensgeschichte des Hubert Maurer weiland Kaiserl. Königl. akademischen Rathes, Professor und Mitglied der vereinigten bildenden Kuenste in Wien nach mündlichen Erzählungen, Original-Aufsätzen und Anm. nebst dem Verzeichnisse seiner Bilder, seinem Porträt und der Ansicht seines Geburtshauses, Vienna, Schrämbl, 1819.
 
 Bettina Hagen: Antike in Wien. Die Akademie und der Klassizismus um 1800. Eine Ausstellung der Gemäldegalerie der Akademie der Bildenden Künste Wien vom 27. November 2002 bis 9. März 2003 und der Winckelmann-Gesellschaft im Winckelmann-Museum Stendal vom 11. Mai bis 27. Juli 2003, Mainz: Philipp von Zabern, 2002, .
 Herbert Weffer: "Aus dem Leben des Malers Hubert Maurer aus Röttgen", in: Die Laterne, Vol.30, 2003, Westdeutsche Gesellschaft für Familienkunde e.V., Bezirksgruppe Bonn

External links 

 More works by Maurer @ ArtNet

1738 births
1818 deaths
18th-century Austrian painters
18th-century Austrian male artists
Austrian male painters
19th-century Austrian painters
19th-century Austrian male artists
Academic staff of the Academy of Fine Arts Vienna